URBan Radio Broadcasting, LLC, (typically written with the first three letters of the word 'urban' capitalized) is an American media company that specializes in radio stations.  The markets where they own radio stations include
Columbus, Mississippi, and Toledo, Ohio.  The company was founded in 1999 by radio entrepreneur Kevin Wagner in Mobile, Alabama, and its headquarters are currently located in Miami, Florida.

Radio stations

Columbus/Starkville/West Point, Mississippi
WMSU 92.1 FM —  Urban
WACR-FM 103.9 FM — Urban AC/Southern Soul
WAJV 98.9 FM — Gospel

Toledo, Ohio
WIMX 95.7 FM — Urban AC
WJZE 97.3 FM — Mainstream Urban

External links
URBan Radio Broadcasting Corporate Website

Radio broadcasting companies of the United States
Urban Radio Broadcasting radio stations